Enemies of Youth is a 1925 American independent silent drama film directed by Arthur Berthelet and starring Mahlon Hamilton, Gladys Leslie and J. Barney Sherry.

Cast
 Mahlon Hamilton	
 Gladys Leslie 
 J. Barney Sherry 		
 Jack Drumier 		
 Jane Jennings		
 Burr McIntosh		
 Charles Delaney	
 Gladys Walton

References

Bibliography
 Munden, Kenneth White. The American Film Institute Catalog of Motion Pictures Produced in the United States, Part 1. University of California Press, 1997.

External links
 

1925 films
1925 drama films
1920s English-language films
American silent feature films
Silent American drama films
American black-and-white films
Films directed by Arthur Berthelet
1920s American films